Salt Creek Township is one of the sixteen townships of Wayne County, Ohio, United States.  The 2000 census found 3,783 people in the township, 3,296 of whom lived in the unincorporated portions of the township.

Demographics
In 2000, 20.9% of Salt Creek residents identified as being of Pennsylvania German heritage. This was the highest percentage of Pennsylvania Germans of any place in the United States, Pennsylvania included.

Geography
Located in the southern part of the county, it borders the following townships:
East Union Township - north
Sugar Creek Township - northeast corner
Paint Township - east
Paint Township, Holmes County - southeast corner
Salt Creek Township, Holmes County - south
Prairie Township, Holmes County - southwest corner
Franklin Township - west

The village of Fredericksburg is located in southwestern Salt Creek Township.

Name and history
It is one of five Salt Creek Townships statewide.

Government
The township is governed by a three-member board of trustees, who are elected in November of odd-numbered years to a four-year term beginning on the following January 1. Two are elected in the year after the presidential election and one is elected in the year before it. There is also an elected township fiscal officer, who serves a four-year term beginning on April 1 of the year after the election, which is held in November of the year before the presidential election. Vacancies in the fiscal officership or on the board of trustees are filled by the remaining trustees.

References

External links
Wayne County township map
County website

Pennsylvania Dutch culture in Ohio
Townships in Wayne County, Ohio
Townships in Ohio